Virgil J. Johnson (born April 23, 1932) is an American politician in the state of Minnesota. He served in the Minnesota House of Representatives.

References

1932 births
Living people
Republican Party members of the Minnesota House of Representatives